The 1978 Pro Bowl was the NFL's 28th annual all-star game which featured the outstanding performers from the 1977 season. The game was played on Monday, January 23, 1978, at Tampa Stadium in Tampa, Florida before a crowd of 50,716. The final score was NFC 14, AFC 13.

Ted Marchibroda of the Baltimore Colts lead the AFC team against an NFC team coached by Los Angeles Rams head coach Chuck Knox. The referee was Fred Wyant.

Walter Payton of the Chicago Bears was named the game's Most Valuable Player. Players on the winning NFC team received $5,000 apiece while the AFC participants each took home $2,500.

Rosters

AFC

Rookies in Italics

<ref="Pro Bowl"></ref>

NFC

 
Rookies in Italics

References

External links

Pro Bowl
Pro Bowl
Pro Bowl
Pro Bowl
20th century in Tampa, Florida
American football competitions in Tampa, Florida
January 1978 sports events in the United States